Peter James Hobday (16 February 1937 – 18 January 2020) was a British radio presenter, best known for presenting the early-morning BBC Radio 4 breakfast current affairs programme Today throughout the 1980s, remaining until 1996. He was a colleague of Brian Redhead and the two men were a regular presenting duo on the programme. Hobday was the presenter of The Money Programme on BBC Two television. He helped launch the late night current affairs programme Newsnight on BBC2, where he was both presenter and economic specialist. He was also involved in launching In Business on Radio 4.

His removal from the Today programme in 1996 was greeted with dismay from its listeners and allegations of ageism were levied at the BBC. Later he presented BBC Radio 4's World at One. Bilingual in French and English, and competent in Italian, he also contributed to French and French-Canadian television.

Following his journalistic career, Hobday ran media training sessions for industry leaders and senior union officials, was a visiting professor at De Montfort University, and worked as a conference chairman. 

Hobday died on 18 January 2020.

His brother John Hobday, who predeceased him, took the part of the first police constable in Ambridge in BBC Radio 4's The Archers.

References

1937 births
2020 deaths
BBC newsreaders and journalists
BBC Radio 4 presenters